I'll Kiss All Fears Out of Your Face is the debut album of the German pop punk band The Deadnotes. This album was released on October 7, 2016 on digital platforms, vinyl through Krod Records, LaserLife Records, Smithsfoodgroup Diy, Sugarferry Records and on CD. It was recorded at Proudly Ugly Studio in Freiburg in Germany by Tiago Fernandes.

Track listing
 "Favourite Shirts" – 4:19 
 "The 21st Century Blues" – 3:50
 "All Tied Up" – 4:14
 "Stay in Touch, Stay Forever" – 4:34
 "Sad & Done" – 4:07
 "Alive" – 3:03
 "Boys & Girls" – 4:41
 "Cardboard" – 3:52
 "Vienna" – 3:12
 "I'm A Dreamer (Homesick)" – 3:03
 "Dead" – 4:04

Personnel 
 Darius Lohmüller – guitar, vocals
 Jakob Walheim – bass guitar, vocals
 Yannic Arens – drums

References 

2016 debut albums
The Deadnotes albums